Matome Calvin Kadi (born 12 December 1987) is a retired South African professional footballer who lastly played for Bidvest Wits, as a striker.

Career
Born in Pietersburg, Kadi played youth football for Remember FC and the University of Pretoria before joining Jomo Cosmos in 2004. He later played for SuperSport United and Bidvest Wits, before signing on loan for a year with Portuguese club Portimonense in July 2010.

In 2011, he moved to Greek club Veria, where he became the second top scorer of 2011–12 Football League with 20 goals, below José Emilio Furtado.

On 22 July 2012, he returned to his former team Wits on a four-year contract.

On 27 December 2012, Calvin Kadi was nominated for "Player of the Year" in the Football League and eventually was named the winner on 14 January 2013.

On 9 February 2019, Kadi announced that he retired from football on his personal Facebook account.

Honours
Football League Player of the Year: 2011-12

References

External links

1987 births
Living people
South African soccer players
South African expatriate soccer players
Jomo Cosmos F.C. players
SuperSport United F.C. players
Association football forwards
Bidvest Wits F.C. players
Portimonense S.C. players
Primeira Liga players
Expatriate footballers in Portugal
Expatriate footballers in Greece
People from Polokwane
Veria F.C. players
Soccer players from Limpopo